Topics related to Yemen (sorted alphabetically) include:



0–9
 23 May 2016 Yemen bombings 
 1992 Yemen hotel bombings 
 2007 attack on tourists in Yemen 
 2008 attack on the United States embassy in Yemen 
 2008 attack on tourists in Yemen 
 2008 Bin Salman mosque bombing 
 2009 Yemeni tourist attacks 
 2012 Sanaʽa bombing 
 2013 Iranian diplomat kidnapping 
 2013 Sana'a attack 
 2014 Ibb bombing 
 2014 Rada' bombings 
 2015 Aden car bombing 
 2015 Sana'a mosque bombings 
 2016 Aden car bombing 
 2016–19 Yemen cholera outbreak

A
Aaragah - 
Aden -
Aden Governorate -
Aden International Airport -
Airstrikes on hospitals in Yemen -
Al-Qaeda in the Arabian Peninsula -
Al-Qaeda insurgency in Yemen -
At Turbah

B
Blockade of Yemen

C
Cabinet of Yemen - COVID-19 pandemic in Yemen

D
December 2016 Aden suicide bombings -
Demographics of Yemen -
Di Asmo

E

F
Famine in Yemen (2016–present)

G
Geography of Yemen -
Geology of Yemen -
Governorates of Yemen

H
Hadhramaut Governorate -
Hadibu -
History of Yemen -
Houthi movement

I

J
June 2016 Mukalla attacks

K
Kamaran -
Kamaran Airport

L
Lebanese International University (Yemen) -
List of airlines of Yemen -
List of airports in Yemen -
List of armed groups in the Yemeni Civil War -
List of aviation shootdowns and accidents during the Saudi Arabian-led intervention in Yemen -
List of banks in Yemen -
List of cities in Yemen -
List of companies of Yemen -
List of defunct airlines of Yemen
List of districts of Yemen -
List of ecoregions in Yemen -
List of flag bearers for Yemen at the Olympics -
List of islands of Yemen -
List of lighthouses in Yemen -
List of mosques in Sana'a -
List of mosques in Yemen -
List of museums in Yemen -
List of volcanoes in Yemen -
List of wadis of Yemen -
List of years in Yemen -
List of Yemenis

M
May 2016 Yemen police bombings -
Missionaries of Charity attack in Aden -
Mocha, Yemen -
Mukalla

N

O
Oman–Yemen relations

P
Politics of Yemen -
President of Yemen

Q
Queen Arwa University -
Qutaibi

R
Republic of Yemen Armed Forces

S
Sanaʽa -
Sanaʽa International Airport -
Shamag -
Saudi Arabian-led intervention in Yemen -
Socotra Airport -
Socotra Governorate -
Southern Transitional Council -
Supreme Political Council

T
Taiz -
Taiz Governorate -
Taiz International Airport -
Timeline of Yemeni history

U
United Nations Yemen Observation Mission -
Unity Day (Yemen)

V

W
Water supply and sanitation in Yemen -
Wildlife of Yemen

X

Y
Yemen -
Yemeni Air Force -
Yemen Arab Republic -
Yemeni Civil War (1994) -
Yemeni Civil War (2015–present) -
Yemeni Crisis (2011–present) -
Yemeni list of most wanted suspected terrorists -
Yemeni Revolution -
Yemenia -
Yemenite War of 1979

Z
Zabid District -
Zinjibar District -
Zuqar Island

See also

Lists of country-related topics

 
Yemen